Poolville Independent School District is a public school district based in the community of Poolville, Texas (USA).

Located in Parker County, a small portion of the district extends into Wise County.

In 2009, the school district was rated "academically acceptable" by the Texas Education Agency.

Schools
Poolville High School (Grades 9-12)
Poolville Junior High School (Grades 6-8)
Poolville Elementary School (Grades PK-5)

Poolville ISD is located northwest of the Dallas/Fort Worth metropolitan area. It has a population as low as 550 students (around 300 in elementary, 100 in junior high, and about 150 in high school).

References

External links

School districts in Parker County, Texas
School districts in Wise County, Texas